The New Life is the 2023 debut novel of British writer Tom Crewe. It is a work of historical fiction set in 1890s London and tells the story of two men collaborating on a study favouring civil rights for what were then called "sexual inverts" and now as the gay community. The work is a historical imagining of LGBT rights before the late 20th century gay rights movement.

See also
 LGBT rights in the United Kingdom

References

External links
 The New Life by Tom Crewe, Simon & Schuster.

LGBT historical fiction
2023 debut novels
2020s LGBT novels
2023 British novels
Novels set in London
British LGBT novels